Jerzego bipartitus, is a species of spider of the genus Jerzego. It is native to India and Sri Lanka.

References

Salticidae
Endemic fauna of Sri Lanka
Spiders of Asia
Spiders described in 1903